Bodman is a surname. Notable people with the surname include:

Henry Bodman (1864–1927), Australian politician
Johannes Wolfgang von Bodman (1651–1691), German Roman Catholic bishop
Nicholas Bodman (1913–1997), American linguist
Nikolaus Bodman (1903–1988), German nobleman
Roger Bodman (born 1952), American politician
Samuel Bodman (1938–2018), American politician

See also
Bodman PLC, an American law firm